Elízio Adriani Silva Albues (born 22 February 1988 in Cuiabá) is a Brazilian professional football player who currently plays for Varzim as a left back.

Career
Born in Cuiabá, Elizio is a youth product of Vila Nova Futebol Clube, only making two caps before going on loan to Grêmio Anápolis.

In 2009, Elízio made his first move abroad, joining Portuguese team, F.C. Penafiel, where he would spend three years and play for more than sixty league matches, earning interest from larger teams.

On 6 July 2012, he moved to Gil Vicente F.C., but did not make any league match, terminating his contract on 7 January 2013, and returning to Grémio Anápolis.

Half a year later, on 4 July 2013, Elizio returned to Portugal, signing a two-year deal with Moreirense. After two seasons in Portugal, with more than fifty league matches played, he was not offered a new contract, so he moved to Cyprus on 19 June 2015. After one year in Cyprus, Elizio returns to Portugal signing a contract with Vizela.

References

External links

1988 births
Living people
People from Cuiabá
Association football defenders
Brazilian footballers
Vila Nova Futebol Clube players
F.C. Penafiel players
Gil Vicente F.C. players
Moreirense F.C. players
Apollon Limassol FC players
F.C. Vizela players
C.D. Nacional players
Varzim S.C. players
Primeira Liga players
Cypriot First Division players
Brazilian expatriate footballers
Brazilian expatriate sportspeople in Portugal
Expatriate footballers in Portugal
Brazilian expatriate sportspeople in Cyprus
Expatriate footballers in Cyprus
Sportspeople from Mato Grosso